Wiklina  is a village in the administrative district of Gmina Wąsosz, within Góra County, Lower Silesian Voivodeship, in south-western Poland.

The name of the village is of Polish origin and its name means "wicker".

References

Wiklina